Jeff Leiker (born March 22, 1962) is an American community college sports administrator and former football player and coach.  He is currently the athletic director at Coffeyville Community College in Coffeyville, Kansas, a position he has held since November 2007.  From 2001 to 2007, Leiker was the head football coach at Coffeyville.  Leiker was the 20th head football at Fort Hays State University in Hays, Kansas, serving for three seasons, from 1998 to 2000, and compiling a record of 13–19.

Head coaching record

References

External links
 Coffeyville Community College profile

1962 births
Living people
Coffeyville Red Ravens football coaches
Fort Hays State Tigers football coaches
Missouri Western Griffons football coaches
Tennessee Volunteers football coaches
Washburn Ichabods football players
University of Tennessee alumni
People from Coffeyville, Kansas